Penn & Teller: Off the Deep End is a two-hour special that premiered on NBC on November 13, 2005. It featured magicians Penn & Teller performing a variety of illusions in various locations around the Caribbean, most of which were done underwater or involved marine animals. It also featured a performance by musician Aaron Carter.

References

External links

About dot com review

NBC original programming
American television magic shows
2000s American television specials
2005 television specials
Television in the Caribbean
The Wolper Organization films